Pirates of the Crimson Coast is the second set and the first expansion to the Pirates of the Spanish Main constructible strategy game produced by WizKids.

Set Details
Pirates of the Crimson Coast had 130 total pieces, and its expansion symbol was a compass. It was the first set to introduce Forts and the Schooner ship type, and also the first to include French ships, with 19 ships as well as a fort and various crew. There was a single Super Rare piece in the set, the Roanoke, a preview of the American faction from the following set, Pirates of the Revolution.

Notable Ships
Roanoke - America, 5-mast, 13 points. This ship is Super Rare and the only American ship in the set. It is relatively slow, and has average cannons, but can handle both Pirate and American crew, making it a flexible choice of ship.
La Ville de Paris - France, 5-mast, 16 points. A giant French ship that moves slowly but has very good cannons. This ship, with a Helmsman crew and a Firepot Specialist is an extremely fierce ship with accurate cannons and a lot of them.
El Neptuno - Spain, 5-mast, 12 points. This ship is fast and long-ranged in cannons. With a possibility for an attack range of 2L, this ship can hit an enemy before it can hit back.  Though the accuracy is not good, having 5 cannons increases the chance of a hit.
HMS Swiftsure - England, 1-mast, 10 points. This ship is fast and accurate. With some cannons never being able to hit it, this ship can severely damage ships without taking a hit if the opposing ship has only long range cannons. Outfitted with a captain, this ship could strike a ship with a total range of L+L+S and the best accuracy any ship naturally has in the game.
Raven - Pirate, 2-mast, 10 points.  The Raven is fast (S+S+S) with a generous hold (4 cargo).  Usually deployed as a treasurer runner with a helmsman and explorer, the enemy is hard pressed to catch her at S+S+S+S before she grabs treasure and heads home.  Should the enemy get too close, her double 2S cannons will certainly make the opposing ship remember the engagement.
Le Dauphin Royal - French, 5 mast, 14 points. The Le Dauphin Royal goes one L, had 5 cargo, and relatively accurate cannons. It gains 1+ to its cannon rolls against English ships. This ability makes it a very powerful ship against the English fleet.

Notable Crew
Pirate - Havana Blackman (SAC Captain), Hag of Tortuga (0LR +5 fleet points), Jonah (0pts, crew cost 0 on this ship)
English - Administrator Scott Bratley (0LR +5 fleet points)
Spanish - Contessa Anita Amore (0LR +5 fleet points)
French - Vicomte Jules de Cissey (0LR +5 fleet points), Capitaine Arathiel (SAC Captain)

Crimson Coast